Evan Walker is the name of:

 Evan Harris Walker (1935–2006), American physicist
 Evan Walker (politician) (1935–2015), Australian politician